Promised Land is a historic mansion located in Braithwaite, Louisiana, USA. It was built in the early 20th century. In 1925, Leander Perez acquired the property and lived there until the early 1960s. It has been listed on the National Register of Historic Places since September 11, 1997.

References

Houses on the National Register of Historic Places in Louisiana
Italianate architecture in Louisiana
Houses completed in 1925
Houses in Plaquemines Parish, Louisiana